The chestnut casebearer moth (Coleophora leucochrysella) was a species of moth in the family Coleophoridae. It was endemic to the United States, where it was found in Indiana, Pennsylvania, and Virginia. It was a highly specialized species, its larvae fed specifically on the leaves of the American Chestnut. It is thought the species became extinct when many of these trees died due to an infection of the fungus Cryphonectria parasitica, which was accidentally introduced from Asia around 1900.

References

Sources
 

leucochrysella
Moths described in 1863
Endemic fauna of the United States
Moths of North America
Extinct insects since 1500
Taxonomy articles created by Polbot